Frata is a commune in Cluj County, Transylvania, Romania. It is composed of eight villages: Berchieșu (Berkenyes), Frata, Oaș, Olariu, Pădurea Iacobeni, Poiana Frății (Bethlentanya), Răzoare (Rozor) and Soporu de Câmpie (Mezőszopor).

Demographics 
According to the census from 2002 there was a total population of 4,382 people living in this commune. Of this population, 87.49% are ethnic Romanians, 8.19% ethnic Romani and 4.24% are ethnic Hungarians.

Natives
Ioan Ploscaru
Vasile Suciu

References 

Communes in Cluj County
Localities in Transylvania